The Truth-Teller's Tale is a fantasy novel by American writer Sharon Shinn, published in 2005.

Plot summary 
Eleda and Adele, mirror twins, discover that they are a Truth-Teller and a Safe-Keeper, respectively. Truth-Tellers are incapable of telling lies and recognize when others are lying, so society relies on their unwavering trustworthiness. Safe-Keepers cannot reveal what is told to them in confidence, and they bear the burden of people's confessions. The sisters do not realize the ramifications of their gifts until their teen years, when romantic and political intrigue abounds, and situations become more adult. Their friend Roelynn, whose wealthy merchant father intends to marry her off to the prince, sows plenty of wild oats behind her father's back. She often drags the sisters into the fray, and the summer they are all 17, a chain of events is set into motion that changes their lives.

Characters

Eleda
The protagonist and narrator of the story. Has blue iris on the right and green on the left. Eleda is a truth-teller, born with the ability and compulsion to tell nothing but the truth. She can also sense when others are lying, with the exception of a young actor named Edgar who claims to love her.

Adele
Eleda's sister, the Secret Keeper. Has a blue iris on the left and a green one on the right. Is in love with Micah, her best friend Roeylnn's older brother. She purposely gives her sister food poisoning on one occasion; however it is revealed she did this in order to keep Eleda from rendezvousing with Edgar who plans to rape her.

Bob
The Father of Eleda and Adela married to Hannah. Runs the Leaf & Berry Inn, named for his daughters. He shows much enthusiasm when it is discovered that his daughters are a safe-keeper and a truth-teller. He believes that his daughters are "perfect" and occasionally cannot tell them apart but only for a few minutes at a time.

Hannah
The mother of Eleda and Adele married to Bob. Runs the Leaf and Berry Inn with her husband. Never mixes her daughters up and believes that they are wonderful and loves them dearly, but does not think they are "perfect". Is close friends with Melinda a dream-maker who stays at the inn frequently. She loves the girls' best friend Roelynn and mistakenly believes that she would love to be queen. She is quite a romantic and believes that the world is a fairytale.

Melinda
A dream-maker who frequently stays at the Leaf & Berry. Is very close to Hannah and always asks her what her greatest wish is whenever she sees her. Kindly, old, and high-class.

Prince Darian/Alexander
The prince and next in line for the throne. A trouble maker that never does what he's told and delights in worrying his mother.

Gregory/Tobin
The cousin to the prince. A trouble maker and always cheers the prince on whenever he does something wrong.

Roelynn
Beautiful and intelligent, she is the Daughter of Karro, the Wealthy Merchant. Sister to Micah, who is Adele's love interest. Frequently "falls in love" and disobeys her father repeatedly. Has been taken advantage of by young men before but learned from her mistakes and in the end helps to save Eleda from making the same mistake.

Karro 
The wealthiest man in the city, but he is greedy and a cheat.  He wants Roelynn to marry the Prince so he may be even more wealthy.  He is only interested in himself, although he does show remorse when told that  only son, Micah, has been lost at sea.

Micah 
Karro's oldest child, Roelynn's brother. His character is quiet and keeps mostly to himself.  He only go to Adele and Eleda's house because he must accompany Roelynn.  He goes into his father shipping embargo and all believe he is dead when the ship goes missing.  He has a love interest with Adele, the twin of keeping secrets.

Eileen 
The daughter of a rich merchant who does business with Karro. She is beautiful, stuck up, and believes that every man is in love with her. When Eleda gets food poisoning from her sister and is unable to make her rendezvous with the handsome young actor Edgar she goes instead. Edgar rapes her and beats her then leaves her bleeding by the road.

Queen Lirabel 
The mother of Prince Darian. She loves her son and daughter. She hopes that her son and Karro's daughter Roelynn will marry since she adores Roelynn however this proves to be difficult since every time she arranges for Roelynn and Darian to meet he doesn't show up.

External links 
 Official Sharon Shinn website
 Unofficial Sharon Shinn Website
 Sharon Shinn at Fantastic Fiction

2005 American novels
American fantasy novels
Novels by Sharon Shinn
Fictional identical twins